Al Ain Superleague Formula team was a motor racing team representing the UAE's Al Ain Club in the Superleague Formula championship.

2008 and 2009 seasons
They finished 12th in the inaugural championship with drivers Andreas Zuber, Bertrand Baguette, Paul Meijer and Dominick Muermans. It was initially announced that Giorgio Pantano would drive for the team in the second SF season, but it was then announced they would not return. However, days later, they were added to the official entry list once again and participated in the first 2 rounds of the season, represented by Spain's Miguel Molina in round 1 and Argentina's Esteban Guerrieri in round 2. However, despite winning the 2nd race at Zolder with series debutant Guerrieri, they were replaced by Sevilla FC from round 3 of the championship. Ultimate Motorsport will service the returning Sevilla entry.

Record
(key)

2008

2009
Super Final results in 2009 did not count for points towards the main championship.

References

External links
 Al Ain Superleague Formula team minisite
 Official Al Ain football club website

Al Ain FC
Superleague Formula club teams
2008 establishments in the United Arab Emirates